Osteodiscus cascadiae, the bigtail snailfish, is a marine fish in the family Liparidae (snailfishes or seasnails). It grows to a lengths from  SL (male/unsexed) to  SL (female). This species is one of three known members of its genus. The species name cascadiae refers to the Cascadia Abyssal Plain, a location off Oregon where the fish has been found.

References

Liparidae
Fish described in 1978